The Wasteland (Persian: دشت خاموش‎, romanized: Dashte khamoush) is a 2020 Iranian drama film directed and written by Ahmad Bahrami. the film premiered on September 3, 2020, at the 77th Venice International Film Festival, where it won the Orizzonti Award.

Synopsis 
A remote brick manufacture factory produces bricks in an ancient way. Many families with different ethnicities work in the factory and the boss seems to hold the key to solving their problems. Forty-year-old Lotfollah (Ali Bagheri), who has been born on-site, is the factory supervisor and acts as go-between for the workers and the boss. Boss (Farrokh Nemati) has Lotfollah gather all the workers in front of his office. He wants to talk to them about the shutdown of the factory. All matters now to Lotfollah is to keep Sarvar (Mahdie Nassaj) unharmed, the woman he has been in love with for a long time.

Cast 
Ali Bagheri as Lotfollah
Farrokh Nemati as Lotfollah's Boss
Mahdie Nassaj as Sarvar
Sepehr Sepi as Pianist
Touraj Alvand
Majid Farhang
Naser Alaghemandan
Narges Amini
Mohsen Yeganeh
Razie Irani
Shaghayegh Aghazadeh
Mahtab Khosh Manesh
Ahoura Bahrami
Parsa Sobhani
Arsha Sobhani
Barsa Bahrami
Mina Sarghare

Reception

Awards and nominations

References

External links 
 

Iranian black-and-white films
Iranian drama films
2020 drama films
2020 films
2020s Persian-language films